Nephropoidea is a superfamily of decapod crustaceans. It contains the true lobsters in the Nephropidae (including the rare thaumastochelid lobsters), and three fossil families: Chilenophoberidae, Protastacidae and Stenochiridae. Their closest relatives are the reef lobsters.

References

True lobsters
Taxa named by James Dwight Dana
Arthropod superfamilies